Government of José Luis Rodríguez Zapatero may refer to:

First government of José Luis Rodríguez Zapatero (2004–2008)
Second government of José Luis Rodríguez Zapatero (2008–2011)